The Thunder Bay Border Cats are a baseball team that plays in the Northwoods League, a collegiate summer baseball league. The league's only Canadian team, their home games are played at Port Arthur Stadium in Thunder Bay, Ontario.

The Border Cats have been Northwoods League champions twice, defeating the Madison Mallards two games to one in both 2005 and 2008. They also were in the Northwoods League championship in 2006, but lost to the Rochester Honkers.

As of 2019, the Border Cats have sent six players to the major leagues. Matt Mangini was the first to make the jump, playing 11 games for the Seattle Mariners in 2011. Shortstop Jonathan Diaz followed two years later, playing four games with the Boston Red Sox in 2013. Diaz also spent time with the Toronto Blue Jays in 2014, almost making the team out of spring training. Pitcher Blaine Hardy became a regular in the Detroit Tigers bullpen in 2014. Seth Frankoff pitched in one game for the Chicago Cubs, while A.J. Schugel spent time with the Pittsburgh Pirates and Wes Parsons is currently with the Atlanta Braves in a relief role.

The Border Cats will not play their 2021 season due to "the ongoing uncertainty of the pandemic regarding the Canada-US border closure as well as outdoor gathering numbers". A travel team known as the Minnesota Mud Puppies, based in the Twin Cities region, will play the Border Cats' originally scheduled 36 road games during the 2021 season. The Border Cats were again left dormant for the 2022 season, with a return intended for the 2023 season.

2009 All-Star Game 

The 2009 Northwoods League All-Star Game was held on July 21 in Thunder Bay. This was the first time the All-Star game played in Canada. The guest speaker for the event was Ferguson Jenkins, a Canadian member of the Baseball Hall of Fame. The game was won 4-2 by the South Division squad, led by the MVP performance of Kurtis Muller, who went 3-for-5.

Notable active alumni & those reaching AAA/Majors

Year-by-year records

References

External links 
 Thunder Bay Border Cats 
 Northwoods League 

Northwoods League teams
Sport in Thunder Bay
Baseball teams in Ontario